(+)-Sabinene synthase (EC 4.2.3.110, SS) is an enzyme with systematic name geranyl-diphosphate diphosphate-lyase [cyclizing, (+)-sabinene-forming]. This enzyme catalyses the following chemical reaction

 geranyl diphosphate  (+)-sabinene + diphosphate

This enzyme is isolated from Salvia officinalis (sage).

References

External links 
 

EC 4.2.3